Eswatini–Taiwan relations refer to the international relations between the Kingdom of Eswatini and Republic of China (Taiwan). Eswatini maintains an embassy in Taipei, and Taiwan maintains an embassy in Mbabane.

History 

Eswatini recognized the Republic of China (ROC) over the People's Republic of China (PRC) on 16 September 1968, and have since maintained formal diplomatic relations with the ROC.

Eswatini is one of 14 nations that recognize the ROC officially. In May 2018, Burkina Faso switched to recognize the People's Republic of China, thus ending diplomatic ties with Taiwan, making Eswatini the last African country to recognize the ROC instead of the PRC.

On the 2018 summit of Forum on China–Africa Cooperation in Beijing, China declared it does “hope that by the time the China-Africa cooperation forum Beijing summit happens, we can have a happy picture of the whole family”, i.e. it hopes to establish diplomatic relations with Swaziland before the summit begins.  The government of Eswatini has rejected these overtures from the People's Republic of China. In response, China has turned up the visa restrictions on Swazis to force Eswatini to establish diplomatic links with itself. Declaring “No diplomatic relations, no business benefits.” In response to the Chinese pressure on Eswatini, Ou Jiang’an, the director of the Foreign Ministry Information Department of Taiwan said “The ugly nature of the Chinese regime and its despicable means of suppression are contemptible, and it should be deterred by international public opinion.“

The Economist claimed in 2021 that Eswatini's relations with Taiwan are second in importance only to those with South Africa.

Bilateral visits
In June 2018, King of Eswatini, Mswati III made his 17th visit to Taiwan, after the President of ROC Tsai Ing-wen visited Eswatini in April.

Taiwanese aid 
Taiwan has provided economic aid to Eswatini, funding a rural electrification scheme and university scholarships.

In September 2021, Taiwan announced it would be providing US$22.9 million in aid to repair schools, hospitals and other infrastructure that were damaged during the civil unrest.

See also
Foreign relations of Eswatini
Foreign relations of Taiwan

References

 
Taiwan
Bilateral relations of Taiwan